Dominic Peitz (born 11 September 1984) is a German former professional footballer who played as a midfielder.

Career
Born in Geseke, Peitz made his debut on the professional league level in the 2. Bundesliga for VfL Osnabrück on 15 August 2008 starting in a game against FC St. Pauli. On 25 August 2012, he signed a permanent contract with Karlsruher SC till 30 June 2015.

References

External links
 
 
 

1984 births
Living people
Association football midfielders
German footballers
SC Paderborn 07 players
SV Werder Bremen II players
VfL Osnabrück players
1. FC Union Berlin players
FC Augsburg players
FC Hansa Rostock players
Karlsruher SC players
Holstein Kiel players
1. FSV Mainz 05 II players
2. Bundesliga players
3. Liga players
Regionalliga players